The following lists events that happened during 1908 in Austria.

Incumbents
Emperor: Franz Joseph I of Austria

Events
The Venus of Willendorf was discovered.

Births
December 31 -Simon Wiesenthal, Nazi hunter (d. 2005)

See also
Austria in 1908 Olympics

References